Kryan Johnson (born 23 March 1994) was a professional rugby league footballer who plays as a winger for Oldham (Heritage № 1385) in the Betfred Championship.

Johnson started playing rugby with Lock Lane when he was seven. He joined Featherstone on a junior scholarship when he was 13 but also played for Castleford Panthers until he was 16 when he signed exclusively with Featherstone. He also spent time on loan at the Hunslet Hawks in Kingstone Press League 1. In October 2017 he joined Oldham on a one-year deal.

References

External links
Oldham profile
Featherstone Rovers profile
Hunslet Hawks profile

1994 births
Living people
English rugby league players
Featherstone Rovers players
Hunslet R.L.F.C. players
Oldham R.L.F.C. players
Rugby league players from Castleford
Rugby league wingers